Bhim Malla was the thirty-fifth king of the Mallabhum. He ruled from 1240 to 1253 CE.

History
Bhim Malla established the idol of the deity Shyam Chand. Extended the boundary of Mallabhum up to the Damodar River in the north.

References

Sources
 

Malla rulers
Kings of Mallabhum
13th-century Indian monarchs
Mallabhum